Robert Charpentier (4 April 1916 – 28 October 1966) was a French racing cyclist who won three gold medals at the 1936 Summer Olympics. In 1937 he turned professional and rode in the 1947 Tour de France.

References

External links
Profile at DatabaseOlympics.com

1916 births
1966 deaths
French male cyclists
Cyclists at the 1936 Summer Olympics
Olympic cyclists of France
Olympic gold medalists for France
Olympic medalists in cycling
People from Issy-les-Moulineaux
Medalists at the 1936 Summer Olympics
French track cyclists
Sportspeople from Hauts-de-Seine
Cyclists from Île-de-France